This is a list of broadcast television stations that are licensed in the U.S. state of Mississippi.

Full-power stations
VC refers to the station's PSIP virtual channel. RF refers to the station's physical RF channel.

Defunct full-power stations
Channel 3: WLBT (original license) - NBC - Jackson (12/19/1953-6/2/1971)
Channel 12: WSLI-TV - ABC - Jackson (3/15/1954-5/31/1955, merged with WJTV ch. 25)
Channel 24: WHTV (original incarnation) - CBS/ABC - Meridian (6/10/1968-10/13/1970)
Channel 30: WCOC-TV - Meridian (12/?/1953-7/30/1954)
Channel 45: WKDH - ABC - Houston (6/18/2001–8/31/2012)

LPTV stations

Translators

Cable-only stations
Piedmont CW - The CW - Greenwood
The Gospel Broadcasting Network  -  GBN  -  Olive Branch
HCN (Hill Country Network) - HCN - New Albany

See also
 Mississippi media
 List of newspapers in Mississippi
 List of radio stations in Mississippi
 Media of locales in Mississippi: Biloxi, Gulfport, Hattiesburg, Jackson

References

Bibliography

External links
 
  (Directory ceased in 2017)
 Mississippi Association of Broadcasters

Mississippi

Television Stations